William Curtis House may refer to:

in the United States
(by state)
William E. Curtis House, Tampa, Florida, listed on the NRHP in Florida
William Curtis House (Newton, Massachusetts), listed on the NRHP in Massachusetts
William A. Curtis House, Raleigh, North Carolina, listed on the NRHP in Wake County, North Carolina
William D. Curtis House, Sandusky, Ohio, listed on the NRHP in Sandusky, Ohio

See also
Curtis House (disambiguation)